Kazimierzów may refer to the following places in Poland:
Kazimierzów, Lower Silesian Voivodeship (south-west Poland)
Kazimierzów, Bełchatów County in Łódź Voivodeship (central Poland)
Kazimierzów, Łódź East County in Łódź Voivodeship (central Poland)
Kazimierzów, Opoczno County in Łódź Voivodeship (central Poland)
Kazimierzów, Rawa County in Łódź Voivodeship (central Poland)
Kazimierzów, Skierniewice County in Łódź Voivodeship (central Poland)
Kazimierzów, Lublin Voivodeship (east Poland)
Kazimierzów, Gostynin County in Masovian Voivodeship (east-central Poland)
Kazimierzów, Łosice County in Masovian Voivodeship (east-central Poland)
Kazimierzów, Mińsk County in Masovian Voivodeship (east-central Poland)
Kazimierzów, Gmina Stoczek in Masovian Voivodeship (east-central Poland)
Kazimierzów, Gmina Wierzbno in Masovian Voivodeship (east-central Poland)
Kazimierzów, Zwoleń County in Masovian Voivodeship (east-central Poland)